Pumas FC was an American soccer team based in Birmingham, Alabama, United States. Founded in 1999, the team played in the National Premier Soccer League (NPSL), a national amateur league at the fourth tier of the American Soccer Pyramid, in the Southeast Division.

The team played its home games on the soccer field at the campus of the University of Alabama at Birmingham, where they had played since 2009. The team's colors were gold, blue, and white.

 the team was no longer listed on the NPSL website and its own website was not available.

Players

2009 Roster
Source:

Year-by-year

Head coaches
  Rolando Hernandez (2009)
  Juan Esparza (2010–present)

References

External links
Pumas FC
West Homewood Soccer Park

Soccer clubs in Birmingham, Alabama
Soccer clubs in Alabama
National Premier Soccer League teams
1999 establishments in Alabama
Association football clubs established in 1999